The 1993–94 Maryland Terrapins Men's Basketball Team represented the University of Maryland as a member of the Atlantic Coast Conference during the 1993–94 season. Led by head coach Gary Williams, the Terrapins made their first NCAA Tournament and Sweet Sixteen under Williams. The team finished with a record of 18–12 (8–8 ACC).

Roster

Schedule and results

|-
!colspan=9 style=| Regular season

|-
!colspan=9 style=| ACC Tournament

|-
!colspan=9 style=| NCAA Tournament

Rankings

References

Maryland Terrapins men's basketball seasons
Maryland
Maryland
1994 in sports in Maryland
1993 in sports in Maryland